Nothing Compares is a 2022 documentary feature film, directed by Kathryn Ferguson. It looks at the life and legacy of Sinéad O'Connor - focusing on the years 1987 - 1993.

The film had its world premiere at the 2022 Sundance Film Festival on January 21, 2022, after which it was acquired by Showtime Documentary Films. The film was theatrically released in the UK and Ireland by Paramount International on October 7, 2022.

Synopsis 
Nothing Compares is the story of Sinéad O’Connor's phenomenal rise to worldwide fame and how her iconoclastic personality resulted in her exile from the pop mainstream. Focusing on her prophetic words and deeds from 1987-1993, the film reflects on the legacy of this fearless trailblazer through a contemporary feminist lens.

Production 
The film is a UK and Ireland Co-Production, produced by Eleanor Emptage and Michael Mallie, and made with support from Field of Vision, Screen Ireland, BFI Doc Society Fund, Northern Ireland Screen and ie:entertainment.

Release 
Nothing Compares had its world premiere at the 2022 Sundance Film Festival on January 21, 2022 in the World Cinema Documentary Competition. It toured the festival circuit picking up multiple awards, including Best Documentary Feature at the 2022 Galway Film Fleadh. On February 1, 2022 Showtime Documentary Films announced that it has acquired worldwide rights to Nothing Compares. The film premiered on Showtime on September 30, 2022. It was released in theatres in the UK and Ireland on October 7, 2022.

Reception

Critical Response 
Nothing Compares received positive reviews from film critics in the USA and the UK and Ireland. On Rotten Tomatoes, it has a 99% approval rating based on reviews from 83 critics. The website's critical consensus reads: “A moving look at Sinéad O'Connor's remarkable life and career, Nothing Compares is enriching viewing whether or not you're a fan of her work”.

The Guardian film critic Peter Bradshaw gave it 4/5 stars, describing it as “a bracing guide to a brilliant individual who declined to conform”. Telegraph Chief Music Critic Neil McCormack gave it 5/5 stars describing it as “the most potent film about the travails of a woman in the pop industry since Asif Kapadia’s 2016 Oscar-winning Amy”.

Accolades 
On December 4, 2022 Nothing Compares received two British Independent Film Awards: Best Debut Director – Feature Documentary for Kathryn Ferguson, and Best Documentary.

References

External links 

Official trailer

2020s biographical films
Irish biographical films
British biographical films
Films set in the 1980s
Films set in the 1990s